Natalya Andrianovna Lisenko (10 August 1884 – 7 October 1969), also known as Nathalie Lissenko, was a Russian actress who was active during the silent era.

Biography
Natalya Andrianovna Lisenko was born on 10 August 1884 to Andrew Lisenko (1851–1910), a physician. She had an older brother, Yuriy Lisenko (1881–1958). Some sources list Lisenko's birth date as 1886. She was the niece of the Ukrainian composer Mykola Lysenko.

In 1904 she left school at Moscow Art Theatre and started to work in theater with her first husband Nikolai Radin. After they were divorced, Natalya Lisenko became the wife of the well known Russian actor Ivan Mosjoukine, and they appeared in multiple films together.

Her film debut was in Katyusha Maslova (1915), directed by Pyotr Chardynin and based on Leo Tolstoy's novel Resurrection.

In 1920, Natalya Lisenko, alongside her husband and several other actors, left Russia and moved to Paris. There, she continued her film career, starring in productions such as Kean (1924) and The Lion of the Moguls (1924). Her final film appearance was in The Fatted Calf (1939).

She died in Paris and is buried in Sainte-Geneviève-des-Bois Russian Cemetery near her second husband Mosjoukine.

Roles in cinema 
1915 — film: Катюша Маслова / Katyusha Maslova — role: Katyusha Maslova
 1915 — Леон Дрей — Berth
 1915 — На окраинах Москвы — Vasilisa, a cook
 1915 — Наташа Проскурова — Natasha
 1915 — Николай Ставрогин
 1915 — Тайна нижегородской ярмарки
 1916 — Без вины виноватые — Kruchinina
 1916 — Грех — Yelena
 1916 — Жизнь — миг, искусство — вечно
 1916 — И песнь осталась недопетой — a countess Валишевская
 1916 — Любовь сильна не страстью поцелуя — a singer in cabaret
 1916 — На бойком месте — Yevgenia
 1916 — Нищая — an actress
 1916 — Суд божий — Rybtsova
 1916 — Сын гадалки — a fortuneteller
 1916 — Ястребиное гнездо — Глаша, любовница Осоргина
 1917 — Во власти греха — Елена
 1917 — Горькая доля — Катерина
 1917 — Кулисы экрана — actress Natalya Lisenko (cameo)
 1917 — Не говорите мне, он умер — Jeanna, the wife of the artist
 1917 — Прокурор — actress Бетти Клай
 1917 — Сатана ликующий (Satan Triumphant) — Esfire
 1918 — Богатырь духа — Iza
 1918 — Father Sergius 
 1918 — Малютка Элли — Клара Кларсон
 1918 — Немой страж — The mistress of the count
 1918 — Черная стая
 1918 — Член парламента
 1919 — Голгофа женщины
 1919 — Наследник по заказу
 1919 — Ответный удар
 1919 — Тайна королевы — Queen
L'Angoissante aventure (France, 1920), as Yvonne Lelys
L'Enfant du carnaval (France, 1921), as Yvonne
1921 — Закон и любовь
Justice d'abord (France, 1921)
1921 — Слуга слепого долга
, (France, 1922), as Sonia
1922 — Голос совести
La Fille sauvage (France, 1922), as Jacqueline Gervoise
Nuit de carnaval (France, 1922)
La Riposte (France, 1922)
1923 — Когда дьявол спит
Le Brasier ardent (France, 1923), as The woman
Calvaire d’amour (France, 1923), as Hélène Brémond
1923 — Проходящие тени
1923 — Страшное приключение (Germany, France) — Clarisse
 (France, 1924), as Marie
Kean (France, 1924), as Countess Elena de Koefeld
Les Ombres qui passent (France, 1924), as Jaqueline del Sorio
The Lion of the Moguls (France, 1924), as Anna
Le Double Amour (France, 1925), as Countess Laure Maresco
Children's Souls Accuse You (Germany, 1927), as Luise Enzenberg
The Loves of Casanova (France, 1927)
 (France, 1927)
Rasputin, the Holy Sinner (Germany, 1928), as Mrs. Tatarinoff
Five Anxious Days (Germany, 1928), as Wladimir Voikoff's mother
Hurrah! I Live! (Germany, 1928), as Johanne Kruis
Nights of Princes (France, 1930)
 (France, 1932)
 (France, 1933)
The 1002nd Night (France, 1933), as Fatima
The Fatted Calf (France, 1939), as La dame de compagnie

References

External links

Russian stage actresses
Russian film actresses
French film actresses
Russian silent film actresses
20th-century Russian actresses
Ukrainian stage actresses
Ukrainian film actresses
Ukrainian silent film actresses
Burials at Sainte-Geneviève-des-Bois Russian Cemetery
1884 births
1969 deaths
White Russian emigrants to France
20th-century French actresses
Emigrants from the Russian Empire to France